Periglischrus is a genus of mites in the family Spinturnicidae. There are more than 30 described species in Periglischrus, found in South, Central, and North America, and in Africa.

The species of Periglischrus, like the other members of this family, are parasites of bats. They live primarily on the wing and tail membranes of bats throughout all stages of life.

Species
These 31 species belong to the genus Periglischrus:

 Periglischrus acutisternus Machado-Allison, 1964
 Periglischrus caligus Kolenati, 1857
 Periglischrus cubanus Dusbábek, 1968
 Periglischrus delfinadoae Dusbábek, 1967
 Periglischrus dusbabeki Machado-Allison & Antequera, 1971
 Periglischrus empheresotrichus Morales-Malacara, Castaño-Meneses & Klompen in Morales-Malacara et al., 2020
 Periglischrus eurysternus Morales-Malacara, Juan & Juste, 2002
 Periglischrus gameroi Machado-Allison & Antequera, 1971
 Periglischrus grandisoma Herrin & Tipton, 1975
 Periglischrus herrerai Machado-Allison, 1965
 Periglischrus hopkinsi Machado-Allison, 1965
 Periglischrus iheringi Oudemans, 1902
 Periglischrus leptosternus Morales-Malacara & López-Ortega, 2001
 Periglischrus micronycteridis Furman, 1966
 Periglischrus moucheti Till, 1958
 Periglischrus nycteris Till, 1958
 Periglischrus ojastii Machado-Allison, 1964
 Periglischrus paracaligus Herrin & Tipton, 1975
 Periglischrus paracutisternus Machado-Allison & Antequera, 1971
 Periglischrus paratorrealbai Herrin & Tipton, 1975
 Periglischrus paravargasi Herrin & Tipton, 1975
 Periglischrus parvus Machado-Allison, 1964
 Periglischrus ramirezi Machado-Allison & Antequera, 1971
 Periglischrus setosus Machado-Allison, 1964
 Periglischrus squamosus Machado-Allison, 1965
 Periglischrus steresotrichus Morales-Malacara & Juste, 2002
 Periglischrus tonatii Herrin & Tipton, 1975
 Periglischrus torrealbai Machado-Allison, 1965
 Periglischrus triaenopsis Benoit, 1961
 Periglischrus vargasi Hoffmann, 1944
 Periglischrus zuluensis Till, 1958

References

Mesostigmata
Articles created by Qbugbot